Lauer is a surname. Notable people with the surname include:

 Andrew Lauer (born 1965), American filmmaker
 Bonnie Lauer (born 1951), American golfer
 Brad Lauer (born 1966), Canadian ice hockey coach
 Bruno Lauer (born 1965), American professional wrestling manager known as Harvey Wippleman
 Christof Lauer (born 1953), German jazz saxophonist
 Chuck Lauer (1865–1915), American baseball player 
 Dutch Lauer (1898–1978), American football player 
 Edward Lauer, American athletic director, 1929–1934
 Eric Lauer (born 1995), American baseball player
 Franz von Lauer (1736–1803), Austrian military officer
 Fred Lauer (1898–1960), American water polo player
 Frederick Lauer (1810–1883), American brewer
 Georgius Lauer, German printer in the late fifteenth century
 Gerhard Lauer (born 1962), German literary scholar
 Heather Lauer, American writer 
 Hilde Lauer (born 1943), Romanian sprint canoer
 Jean-Philippe Lauer (1902–2001), French architect and Egyptologist
 Karl Fritz Lauer (1938-2018) German-Romanian agriculturalists 
 Klaus Lauer (born 1950), German neuroepidemologist
 Larry Lauer (born 1927), American football player 
 Len Lauer, American businessman 
 Martin Lauer (1937–2019), West German sprinter
 Matt Lauer (born 1957), American television journalist
 Paul Lauer (born 1962), American entrepreneur and author
 Peter Lauer, American music video and television director
 Sandra Ann Lauer (born 1962), German pop singer known as Sandra
 Tod R. Lauer (born 1957), American astronomer
 Tony Lauer (born 1935), Australian police commissioner
 Walter E. Lauer (1893–1966), American military officer

See also
 Bob deLauer (1920–2002), American football player 
 Laur (surname), an Estonian name